Pessopteryx is an extinct genus of ichthyosaur from the Early Triassic (Olenekian) of Svalbard, Norway. The genus originally contained four species, P. nisseri, P. arctica, P. pinguis, and P. minor, which were named in 1910 by Carl Wiman. Only P. nisseri is still considered valid; P. arctica and P. pinguis are considered nomina dubia while P. minor was reassigned to the tenuous genus Isfjordosaurus. Omphalosaurus nisseri, Merriamosaurus hulkei, and Rotundopteryx hulkei are all junior synonyms of P. nisseri.

References

Early Triassic ichthyosaurs
Early Triassic reptiles of Europe
Fossils of Norway
Fossil taxa described in 1910
Ichthyosauromorph genera